REMA 1000-ligaen is the premier professional men's handball league in Norway. It was established in 1966, and it is currently contested by twelve teams. Sandefjord TIF is the championship's most successful team with nine titles, followed by Oppsal IF with six. Elverum Håndball is the most successful in the Playoffs, with 11 titles. The former sponsor of the league was Grundig, hence the former name "GRUNDIGligaen".

Teams
The thirteen teams of the 2020–21 season. Elverum Håndball are the defending champions.

EHF league ranking

For season 2021/2022, see footnote

14.  (11)  Ukrainian Handball Super League (34.17)
15.  (15)  Swiss Handball League (30.67)
16.  (16)  Eliteserien (29.50)
17.  (28)  Extraliga (22.00)
18.  (17)  Russian Handball Super League (21.33)

|}

Champions
The complete list of the Norwegian men's handball champions since 1966.

References

External links
 www.handball.no

Handball competitions in Norway
Nor
Professional sports leagues in Norway